Eckart Dux (born 19 December 1926) is a German actor and voice actor.

Biography 
His father was an Insurance executive. He completed his training as an actor with Else Bongers in Berlin and made his stage debut in 1948 at the city's Renaissance Theatre. He then had numerous roles on the Berlin stage and in theatres in Munich, Hamburg, Frankfurt and Stuttgart. He also had many roles as a character actor in film and television.

Since 1949, he has also been one of the longest active German-speaking voice actors, dubbing Hollywood films into German. In the 1950s and 1960s he was regularly the German voice of Audie Murphy. He also dubbed Anthony Perkins in many roles including Psycho, Steve Martin, Fred Astaire, George Peppard (in the action series The A-Team) and Jerry Stiller. After Joachim Höppner died in 2006, he took over the dubbing of Ian McKellen as the wizard Gandalf. He dubbed David Jason as Rincewind in Terry Pratchett's The Colour of Magic. He has also worked as an actor and narrator on radio.

Dux was married to the actress Gisela Peltzer. He lives in Sassenburg and his current wife is the editor Marlies Dux.

Selected filmography 
 The Merry Wives of Windsor (1950)
 The House in Montevideo (1951)
 Mailman Mueller (1953)
 Don't Forget Love (1953)
 The Singing Ringing Tree (1957)
 Two Hearts in May (1958)
 We Cellar Children (1960)
 Jack and Jenny (1963)
 My Daughter and I (1963)

Television 
  (1962, TV miniseries)
 Polizeifunk ruft (1966–1970)
 Hamburg Transit (1971–1974)
 Butler Parker (1972–1973)

Radio plays 
 2015: Benjamin Lebert: Mitternachtsweg, part of the series: Gruselkabinett, publisher: Titania Medien,

External links 

Eckart Dux at the German Dubbing Card Index

1926 births
Living people
German male film actors
German male television actors
German male voice actors
Male actors from Berlin
20th-century German male actors